Christa Beatrice Miller is an American actress and model who has achieved success in television comedy. Her foremost roles include Kate O'Brien on The Drew Carey Show and Jordan Sullivan on Scrubs. She has also appeared in Seinfeld, The Fresh Prince of Bel-Air and CSI: Miami. From 2009 to 2015, she starred in the TBS (formerly ABC) sitcom Cougar Town.

Early life 
Miller's days as a child model were curtailed after an operation for a benign bone tumor. After attending Convent of the Sacred Heart, she returned briefly to modeling, but soon took acting lessons, and gave up modeling when she moved to Los Angeles in 1990.

Career 
Miller's first role on television was in Kate & Allie, which starred her real-life aunt, Susan Saint James, whom she resembles. She then appeared in episodes of Northern Exposure, Fresh Prince of Bel Air, and Party of Five. She had a small role in the horror film Stepfather III (1992) with Priscilla Barnes. Miller later appeared twice on Seinfeld, as two different characters. In the 1993 episode "The Sniffing Accountant", she played the prospective boss of George Costanza. She had intended to be a dramatic actress, and this role proved to be a turning point for Miller, who realized how much she enjoyed comedy. Two years later, she returned to Seinfeld in "The Doodle" to play George's girlfriend, Paula. This episode proved to be a boon to her career, as she convinced co-creator Larry David to provide her with a rough-cut video of the still-unaired episode when she auditioned for The Drew Carey Show, whose producers had initially thought she was too inexperienced. David's support helped Miller win over the producers of The Drew Carey Show, who cast her as Kate O'Brien, whom she played from 1995 to 2002.

In 2001, Miller's husband, writer-producer Bill Lawrence, conceived a new comedy drama, Scrubs. Miller was given a guest role as Dr. Cox's (John C. McGinley) acerbic ex-wife Jordan Sullivan. Originally, the character was intended to appear in only one episode; in season 2, the role became recurring. When her young cousin Teddy Ebersol, son of Susan St. James and Dick Ebersol, died in a plane crash in 2004, Scrubs dedicated the season 4 episode "My Lucky Charm" to him. Miller also was the voice of Cleopatra in the short-lived animated show Clone High. She had a leading role in the 2008 two-part TV miniseries The Andromeda Strain. She also appeared in the CSI: Miami episode Divorce Party.

In 2009, Miller began starring on Cougar Town, a sitcom created and produced by her husband and starring Courteney Cox, with whom Miller worked in a three-part story-arc of season 8 of Scrubs.

Personal life 
Miller married Bill Lawrence in 1999. They have three children; Charlotte, William, and Henry.

In 2013, she posed nude for the May issue of Allure magazine.

Filmography

Film

Television

References

External links 
 

Living people
20th-century American actresses
21st-century American actresses
American female models
American film actresses
American television actresses
Convent of the Sacred Heart (NYC) alumni
Female models from New York (state)
People from Manhattan
Schools of the Sacred Heart alumni
Year of birth missing (living people)